is a Japanese politician serving in the House of Representatives in the Diet (national legislature) as a member of the Liberal Democratic Party. A native of Joetsu, Niigata he was elected for the first time in 2005.

References

External links 
  in Japanese.

1960 births
Living people
People from Niigata Prefecture
Waseda University alumni
Koizumi Children
Members of the House of Representatives (Japan)
Liberal Democratic Party (Japan) politicians